Carolyn P. Chiechi (born December 6, 1943) is a retired judge of the United States Tax Court.

Chiechi graduated first in her class from Georgetown University in 1965, and earned a J.D. in 1969, an LL.M. in Taxation in 1971, and a Doctor of Laws, Honoris Causa, in 2000. After completing her LL.M., she served as an advisor to Judge Leo H. Irwin of the United States Tax Court from 1969-71. She then engaged in private practice with Sutherland Asbill & Brennan from 1971 to 1992, making partner in 1976. On October 1, 1992, Chiechi was appointed by President George H. W. Bush as Judge, United States Tax Court, for a term ending September 30, 2007. She retired on September 30, 2007, but continued to perform judicial duties as Senior Judge on recall until October 19, 2018.

Activities and honoraria
District of Columbia Bar: Member, 1969–Present; Member, Taxation Section, 1973–99; Member, Taxation Section Steering Committee, 1980–82, Chairperson, 1981–82; Member, Tax Audits and Litigation Committee, 1986–92, Chairperson, 1987–88.
American Bar Association: Member, 1969–Present; Member, Section of Taxation, 1969–Present; Member, Committee on Court Procedure, 1991–Present; Member, Litigation Section, 1995–2000; Member, Judicial Division, 1997-2000.
Federal Bar Association: Member, 1969–Present; Member, Section of Taxation, 1969–Present; Member, Judiciary Division, 1992–Present.
Women's Bar Association of the District of Columbia: Member, 1992–Present.
Fellow, American College of Tax Counsel.
Fellow, American Bar Foundation.
Member, Board of Governors, Georgetown University Alumni Association, 1994–97, 1997-2000.
Member, Board of Regents, Georgetown University, 1988–94; 1995-2001.
Member, National Law Alumni Board, Georgetown University, 1986-93.
Member, Board of Directors, Stuart Stiller Memorial Foundation, 1986-99.
Member, American Judicature Society, 1994–Present.
One of several recipients of the first Georgetown University Law Alumni Awards (1994). One of several recipients of the first Georgetown University Law Center Alumnae Achievement Awards (1998).
Admitted to Who's Who in American Law, Who's Who of American Women, and Who's Who in America.

Attribution
Material on this page was copied from the website of the United States Tax Court, which is published by a United States government agency, and is therefore in the public domain.

References

1943 births
Living people
Georgetown University alumni
Judges of the United States Tax Court
United States Article I federal judges appointed by George H. W. Bush
20th-century American judges
Georgetown University Law Center alumni
People from New Jersey
21st-century American judges
20th-century American women judges
21st-century American women judges